The A426 road is a road in England which runs from the city of Leicester to the market town of Southam in Warwickshire via the towns of Lutterworth and Rugby.

History

Until the M1 motorway was completed in the 1960s this route formed the main route between Rugby and Leicester, now much quieter as all but local traffic uses the motorway. However, the local traffic has increased as Magna Park, a prominent East Midlands warehouse facility, has developed close to Lutterworth. Broughton Astley, a couple of miles north-west of Dunton Bassett and other local villages can often become congested with goods vehicles en route between Magna Park, the M1 motorway and the M6 Motorway. At rush hours the road can become gridlocked and reduced to less than 40 mph, particularly as agricultural traffic frequently uses the stretch. For this reason, journeys between Blaby and Rugby during rush hour can take much longer than anticipated.

The A426 crosses the route of the former A45 in Dunchurch, this would have formed one of the main routes between the Midlands and South East. Dunchurch is now bypassed to the South by the M45 motorway, and the A426 no longer meets the A45

Route

The A426 starts on the Leicester Inner Ring Road, heading South through the suburbs of the city, crossing the Outer Ring Road and bypassing the village of Blaby. It crosses over the M1 which it runs parallel to for the next  or so. The road becomes rural in nature until entering the small town of Lutterworth and crossing the A4303 Southern Bypass. It starts a descent into Rugby as a dual carriageway with 5 local access roundabouts. Approaching the Town Centre the road becomes single carriageway again and crosses under the West Coast Main Line. It passes the main Town Centre to the West and heads Southwards out of the town towards Dunchurch after which it passes over the M45 and once again becomes a rural road for its final length to terminate on the A423 Southam bypass.

Former routes
The A426, compared to other routes is a relatively untouched road, with only a single bypass:
 The road used to travel through the village of Blaby, now bypassed

Bus corridor
A controversial decision to allow a bus corridor to be constructed on the A426 from Blaby into Leicester was given the go ahead despite heavy local opposition.

References

Roads in England
Transport in Leicestershire
Transport in Leicester
Roads in Warwickshire